Pholidobolus dicrus, Uzzell's pholiodobolus, is a species of lizard in the family Gymnophthalmidae. It is endemic to Ecuador.

References

Pholidobolus
Reptiles of Ecuador
Endemic fauna of Ecuador
Reptiles described in 1973
Taxa named by Thomas Marshall Uzzell, Jr.